Back to Avalon is the sixth studio album by American singer-songwriter Kenny Loggins. Released in 1988, it yielded the hit singles "Nobody's Fool (Theme from Caddyshack II)" (a #8 hit in the U.S.), "I'm Gonna Miss You", "Tell Her", and "Meet Me Half Way" (a #11 hit in the U.S.), the last of which is a ballad which had already become a top 40 hit the previous year through the film Over the Top. It is the only studio album by Loggins to feature songs from motion picture soundtracks to date.

Track listing
 "Nobody's Fool" (Kenny Loggins, Michael Towers) – 4:18
 "I'm Gonna Miss You" (Pam Reswick, Steve Werfel, Jeff Pescetto) – 4:23
 "Tell Her" (Bert Russell) – 3:36
 "One Woman" (Loggins, Richard Page, John Lang) – 4:07
 "Back to Avalon" (Loggins, Peter Wolf, Nathan East) – 5:40
 "She's Dangerous" (Loggins, Michael McDonald) – 5:17
 "True Confessions" (Martin Briley, Richard Feldman) – 3:46
 "Hope for the Runaway" (Loggins, Patrick Leonard) – 4:25
 "Isabella's Eyes" (Loggins, Keith Diamond) – 4:46
 "Blue on Blue" (Loggins, Towers, Robert Irving) – 3:53
 "Meet Me Half Way" (Giorgio Moroder, Tom Whitlock) – 3:39

Personnel 
Back to Avalon personnel

 Kenny Loggins – lead vocals, backing vocals (1, 2, 5, 6, 8), guitar (1, 6), acoustic guitar (3)
 Claude Gaudette – keyboards (1), programming (1), arrangements (1)
 Peter Wolf – multi instruments (2, 5, 7), arrangements (2, 5, 7, 9), keyboards (9), bass (9), drums (9), percussion (9)
 Arthur Barrow – synthesizers (3), bass (3)
 Gary Chang – Synclavier (3), synthesizer arrangements (3)
 Steve George – keyboards (4)
 Patrick Leonard – keyboards (6, 8), programming (6)
 Michael McDonald – keyboards (6), lead and backing vocals (6)
 Jai Winding – acoustic piano (8)
 Kim Bullard – keyboards (10), programming (10)
 Brian Banks – synthesizers (11)
 Anthony Marinelli – synthesizers (11)
 Giorgio Moroder – synthesizers (11)
 Terry Wilson – synthesizers (11)
 Dann Huff – guitar (1, 2, 5-9, 11)
 Richie Zito – guitar (3, 11)
 Steve Farris – guitar (4)
 Robert F. McRae – guitar (7)
 David Williams – guitar (8)
 Tim Pierce – guitar (10)
 John Pierce – bass (10)
 Mickey Curry – drums (3)
 Pat Mastelotto – drums (4)
 John Robinson – drums (6)
 Jonathan Moffett – drums (8)
 Mike Baird – drums (10)
 Luis Conte – percussion (8)
 Dan Higgins – tenor saxophone (9)
 Larry Williams – tenor saxophone (9)
 Gary Grant – trumpet (9)
 Jerry Hey – trumpet (9), horn arrangements (9)
 Jeff Pescetto – backing vocals (1, 2)
 Donny Baldwin – backing vocals (2, 7)
 Mickey Thomas – backing vocals (2, 7)
 Siedah Garrett – additional vocals (3), backing vocals (4)
 Tata Vega – additional vocals (3)
 Carolyn Dennis – backing vocals (4)
 Richard Page – backing vocals (4)
 Ina Wolf –  backing vocals (5, 9)
 Grace Slick – backing vocals (7)
 Tampa Lann – backing vocals (8)
 Maxi Anderson – backing vocals (9)
 Merry Clayton – backing vocals (9)
 Jim Gilstrap – backing vocals (9)
 Oren Waters – backing vocals (9)

Production 
 Dennis Lambert – producer (1)
 Peter Wolf – producer (2, 5, 7 & 9)
 Richie Zito – producer (3 & 10)
 Richard Page – producer (4)
 Patrick Leonard – producer (6 & 8)
 Giorgio Moroder – producer (11)
 Michael Dilbeck – executive producer (1), creative consultant
 Arlene J. Matza – production coordination
 Carol Thompson – production coordination
 David Bianco – engineer (1)
 Doug Rider – engineer (1)
 Paul Ericksen – engineer (2 & 5)
 Phil Kaffel – engineer (3 & 10)
 Terry Nelson – engineer (4 & 9)
 Tony Peluso – engineer (4)
 Mick Guzauski – engineer (6)
 Ian Eales – engineer (8)
 Brian Malouf – mixing (1-10), engineer (6, 7 & 9)
 Brian Reeves – engineer and  mixing (11)
 Doug Sax – mastering (1-10)
 Brian Gardner – mastering (11)
 Margo Chase – cover design
 John Coulter – art direction
 Victoria Pearson – photography
 Larry Larson – management

Studios 
 Recorded at: Can-Am Recorders (Tarzana, CA); Record Plant, Image Recording Studios, Rumbo Recorders, Motown Recording Studios, Garden Rake Studios, Gary Chang Studio and The Village Recorder (Los Angeles, CA); Soundcastle and TTG Studios (Hollywood, CA); Bill Schnee Studios (North Hollywood, CA); Encore Studios, Ground Control Studios, Johnny Yuma Recording, Monday To Sunday and The Enterprise (Burbank, CA); Santa Barbara Sound Design (Santa Barbara, CA); Chartmaker Studios (Malibu, CA); Gateway Studios (Carpinteria, CA); Studio City Sound and Gigot's Ears (Studio City, CA); Aryln Studios (Austin, TX).
 Mixed at: Can-Am Recorders (Tarzana, CA); Image Recording Studios and Skip Saylor Recording (Los Angeles, CA); A&M Studios (Hollywood, CA).
 Mastered at: The Mastering Lab and Bernie Grundman Mastering (Hollywood, CA).

Notes 

1988 albums
Kenny Loggins albums
Albums produced by David Foster
Albums produced by Michael Omartian
Albums produced by Peter Wolf
albums produced by Giorgio Moroder 
Columbia Records albums